The Old Stone Church is a historic sandstone church located in Kingwood Township in Hunterdon County, New Jersey. It was built in 1837 and is now owned by the First Unitarian Universalist Fellowship of Hunterdon County. The church, described using its historic name, Old Stone Presbyterian Church in Kingwood, was added to the National Register of Historic Places on January 25, 2018 for its significance in architecture. The earlier church located here was a smaller stone building built in 1755, called the Old Stone Meetinghouse. The stones from this church were probably used to build the current one. The Kingwood congregation was established in 1728 and grew during the First Great Awakening, with Gilbert Tennent and George Whitefield preaching here in 1739.

The Oak Summit School, located next to the church, is a one-room schoolhouse that was established in 1849 and used until 1953. The building is not part of this NRHP listing.

Gallery

Oak Summit Cemetery

The cemetery for the Presbyterian church was established on the south side of Oak Summit Road in 1754. It is not part of this NRHP listing.

References

External links
 
  Oak Summit Cemetery
 
 
 

Kingwood Township, New Jersey
Churches in Hunterdon County, New Jersey
Churches completed in 1837
Unitarian Universalist churches in New Jersey
Cemeteries in Hunterdon County, New Jersey
National Register of Historic Places in Hunterdon County, New Jersey
Churches on the National Register of Historic Places in New Jersey
New Jersey Register of Historic Places
Stone churches in New Jersey